Robert John Gurney Anderson (16 June 1925 – 11 January 2005), known as Ian Anderson, was a President of the Legislative Council of the Isle of Man.

Mr Anderson was born in Glencross, Rathmullan, County Donegal, Ireland, in 1925.  He left school at the age of 13 and joined the Belfast Technical College before moving to the Isle of Man in 1946.  In 1963 Ian was elected as a member of Patrick commissioners and remained as such until being elected as member of the House of Keys for Glenfaba.  In 1982 he was elevated to the Legislative Council and remained a member until retiring from Tynwald in 1993.  In 1988 he was elected as the, second ever non-Governor, President of the Legislative Council.  He served until 1990 when the constitution was altered and Sir Charles Kerruish became ex officio President.  Ian Anderson also held many Ministerial-level appointments during his career.  He died on 11 January 2005.

His son is David Anderson MHK.

Governmental positions
Minister of Industry, 1986-1988
Member of the Executive Council, 1971-1982
Chairman of the Local Government Board
Chairman of the Police Board
Chairman of the Home Affairs Board
Chairman of the Civil Service Commission

1925 births
2005 deaths
Manx politicians
Manx people of Irish descent
Politicians from County Donegal